Kakadwadi is a village in Miraj Taluka in Sangli District of Maharashtra State, India. It belongs to Desh or Paschim Maharashtra region, belongs to Pune Division. It is located 14 km towards North from District headquarters Sangli, 13 km from Miraj, 348 km from State capital. Kakadwadi Local Language is Marathi.

Demographic 
Kakadwadi Village Total population is 961 and number of houses are 184. Female Population is 48.8%. Village literacy rate is 78.6% and the Female Literacy rate is 34.4%.

References 

Villages in Ahmednagar district